Awkimarka (Quechua awki prince / a mythical figure of the Andean culture / grandfather, marka village, Hispanicized spelling Auquimarca) is an archaeological site in Peru. It is situated in the Huánuco Region, Ambo Province, Tomay Kichwa District.

References 

Archaeological sites in Peru
Archaeological sites in Huánuco Region